Mark Biltz (born June 25, 1956) is an American Christian pastor and author. His theories correlate solar and lunar eclipses with biblical prophecy, and he has published several books on the topic. He is the Washington state director of Christians United for Israel. He began writing about the "blood moon" tetrad phenomenon in 2008, and has come to be known as "the blood moons pastor" or "Blood Moon Biltz". His writings correlate lunar and solar eclipses with the modern State of Israel.

Biography

In 1975, he attended Kansas Newman College and started to take an interest in Judaic studies. Soon after, he left the Roman Catholic Church and studied evangelism.

In 1987, he moved to Washington state and served as an administrative teacher of South King County Bible College in Seattle, Washington.

In 2008, he started researching a phenomenon he called the "Blood Moon", correlating data on NASA's website with the Hebrew calendar and the modern State of Israel. Since then, he has come to be known as "Blood Moons Biltz" and “the blood moons pastor”.

Biltz hosts his own show on the PTL TV Network entitled Discovering the Ancient Paths.

Works
 Blood Moons: Decoding the Imminent Heavenly Signs (2014) 
 Sooner Than You Think: A Prophetic Guide to the End Times (with Sid Roth, Perry Stone, Tom Horn, L.A. Marzulli, Paul McGuire, and John Shorey, 2015) 
 God's Day Timer: The Believer's Guide to Divine Appointments (2016) 
 The Three Messiahs: The Startling Connection Between the Jewish Messiah, the Antichrist, and the Twelfth Imam (2017) 
 Decoding the Antichrist and the End Times: What the Bible Says and What the Future Holds (2019) 
 Decoding the Prophet Jeremiah: What an Ancient Prophet Says About Today (2020)

TV appearances

See also
 Blood moon prophecy
 Predictions and claims for the Second Coming of Christ
 John Hagee
 Christians United for Israel
 Center for Jewish–Christian Understanding and Cooperation

References

Living people
1956 births
20th-century apocalypticists
20th-century evangelicals
21st-century American male writers
21st-century American non-fiction writers
21st-century apocalypticists
21st-century evangelicals
American Christian Zionists
American male non-fiction writers
American religious leaders
Evangelical theologians
Evangelical writers
People from Tacoma, Washington